Krasnaya Polyana is a rural locality (a village) in Mikyashevsky Selsoviet, Davlekanovsky District, Bashkortostan, Russia. The population was 66 as of 2010. There are 2 streets.

Geography 
Krasnaya Polyana is located 17 km west of Davlekanovo (the district's administrative centre) by road. Kirovo is the nearest rural locality.

References 

Rural localities in Davlekanovsky District